This is a list of active and extinct volcanoes in Rwanda.

References 

Rwanda
 
Volcanoes